The Archdiocese of Urbino–Urbania–Sant'Angelo in Vado is a Latin Church ecclesiastical territory or archdiocese of the Catholic Church in the Province of Pesaro and Urbino in the Marche region of central Italy. The current archbishop is Giovanni Tani, appointed in June 2011. It was previously a metropolitan see.

Its cathedral is a minor basilica and World Heritage Site: Basilica Cattedrale di S. Maria Assunta, in Urbino. It has two co-cathedrals, both former cathedrals of absorbed diocese whose title was also adopted: another minor basilica, the Basilica Concattedrale di S. Michele Arcangelo, dedicated to the archangel Saint Michael, in Sant’Angelo in Vado,  and the Concattedrale di S. Cristoforo Martire, dedicated to the protomartyr Saint Christopher, in Urbania.

History 
Urbino is the ancient Urbinum Mataurense, a Roman municipium. Urbino was held by the Ostrogoths from the late 5th century, but was captured by Belisarius (538). Under Pepin the Short it became part of the pontifical domain.
Circa 590 it was established as Diocese of Urbino, on reassigned territory from the suppressed Diocese of Sant'Angelo in Vado. 
 On 1401.03.08 it lost territory to establish the Abbacy nullius of San Cristoforo di Castel Durante
 On 1563.07.07 it was promoted as Metropolitan Archdiocese of Urbino by Pope Pius IV, initially with six suffragan sees: Diocese of Cagli, Diocese of Sinigaglia, Diocese of Pesaro, diocese of Fossombrone, Diocese of Montefeltro and Diocese of Gubbio; later were added : diocese of S. Angelo in Vado and Diocese of Pergola.
 On 1636.10.20 it lost territory to its suffragan Diocese of Sant'Angelo in Vado
 On 1986.09.30 it was renamed as Archdiocese of Urbino–Urbania–Sant’Angelo in Vado/Urbinaten(sis)–Urbanien(sis)–Sancti Angeli in Vado (Latin), having gained territory from the suppressed Diocese of Urbania and Sant'Angelo in Vado, whose titles its adopted, turning its cathedral into co-cathedrals.
 In 2000 the archdiocese lost its status as metropolitan see, becoming part of the ecclesiastical province of the Metropolitan Archdiocese of Pesaro.

Bishops of Urbino
Erected: 6th Century
Latin Name: Urbinatensis

 the first known bishop of Urbino, Leontius, whom Pope Gregory the Great gave the diocese of Rimini (592). 
 Theodoricus (1021 – death 1049), who transferred the cathedral within the city (the ancient cathedral was outside)
 Teuzone (1050–?)
 Blessed Mainardo (1056 – death 1088)
 Pietro (1088–?)
 Guido (1145–?), died 1146 
 Giso (1162 – death 1192)
 Ugo Brandi (1192 – death 1203)
 Vivio (1204 – death 1213)
 Ranieri (1214–?)
 Oddone (1220 – death 1242)
 Pietro (1242 – death 1258)
 Guido Brancaleoni (1259 – death 1283)
 Egidio (1285 – death 1309); in his time, Blessed Pelnigotto, a Franciscan Tertiary, and Blessed Clare of Rimini lived in the city. 
 Giacomo, Friars Minor (O.F.M.) (1309 – death 1317)
 Alessandro Guidi (1317 – death 1340)
 Marco Rognoni, O.F.M. (1342 – 1347) =? Marco Boncioni, (1342), theologian.
 Bartolomeo Carusi, O.F.M. (1347 – 1349), theologian. 
 Francesco Brancaleoni (1350.05.02 – death 1370), previously Bishop of Jesi (Italy) (1342.07.18 – 1350.05.02)
 Guglielmo da Urbino, O.F.M. (1373.03.30 – 1379.01.15); previously Bishop of Narni (Italy) (1367.04.12 – 1373.03.30); later uncanonical Latin Patriarch of Jerusalem (1379.01.15 – ?)
 Francesco, O.F.M. (1379 – 1379); under him the hermitage of the Gerolamini on Monte Cesana was established; 
Oddone Colonna (1380), later Pope Martin V; 
Giacomo Balardi Arrigoni, O.P. (11 Dec 1424 – 12 Sep 1435 Died)
Antonio Altan San Vito (10 Feb 1436 – 1450 Died) 
Latino Orsini (23 Dec 1450 – 11 Sep 1452 Resigned)
Andrea Veroli (11 Sep 1452 – 26 May 1463 Appointed, Bishop of Muro Lucano) 
Girolamo Staccoli (29 May 1463 – 1468) 
Giovanni Battista Mellini (27 April 1468 – 24 Jul 1478 Died)  
Lazarus Racanelli, O.P. (14 August 1478 – 1484 Died)  
Filippo Contorni (20 Sep 1484 – 16 April 1491 Died)  
Giampietro Arrivabene (1491–1504),  learned writer and restorer of discipline;
Gabriele de' Gabrielli (27 Mar 1504 – 5 Nov 1511 Died)
Antonio Trombetta (7 Nov 1511 – 1514 Resigned)
Domenico Grimani (29 May 1514 – 17 July 1523 Resigned) 
Giacomo Narducci (17 Jul 1523 – 14 Jan 1540 Died) 
Dionisio Laurerio, O.S.M. (13 Feb 1540 – 17 Sep 1542 Died)
 Cardinal Gregorio Cortese (Giovanni Andrea Cortese), O.S.B. (6 Nov 1542 – 21 Sep 1548 Died) 
Giulio della Rovere (24 Sep 1548 – 18 Nov 1551 Appointed, Administrator of Novara) 
Felice Tiranni (18 Nov 1551 – 1 Feb 1578 Died), reformer of religious life.

Archbishops of UrbinoElevated: 7 July 1563Latin Name: Urbinatensis Antonio Giannotti da Montagnana (11 Aug 1578 – 1597 Died), in 1578 opened the archdiocesan seminary <ref name="Catholic Encyclopedia' article">[http://www.newadvent.org/cathen/15221b.htm Catholic Encyclopedia' article]</ref>
Giuseppe Ferrerio (1597 – 16 March 1610 Died) 
Benedetto Ala (5 May 1610 – 27 April 1620 Died) 
Ottavio Accoramboni (17 May 1621 – 1623 Resigned) 
Paolo Emilio Santori (Santorio) (20 Nov 1623 – 4 Aug 1635 Died) 
Antonio Santacroce (9 June 1636 – 1639 Resigned) 
Francesco Vitelli (16 Nov 1643 – Feb 1646 Died) 
Ascanio Maffei (25 June 1646 – Oct 1659 Died), restored many churches 
Giacomo de Angelis (20 Sep 1660 – 1667 Resigned) 
Callisto Puccinelli, O.S.M. (16 March 1667 – 12 April 1675 Died) 
Giambattista Candiotti (9 Sep 1675 – Sep 1684 Died) 
Antonio Francesco Roberti (10 Sep 1685 – 26 Jan 1701 Died) 
Antonio Francesco Sanvitale (6 May 1709 – 17 Dec 1714 Died) 
Giovanni Tommaso Maria Marelli, C.O. (7 Dec 1716 – 23 Feb 1739), next Archbishop-Bishop of Imola) 
Antonio Guglielmi (22 June 1739 – 5 Feb 1766 Died) 
Domenico Monti (14 April 1766 – 8 Sep 1787 Died) 
Spiridione Berioli (17 Dec 1787 – 19 April 1819 Died) 
Ignazio Ranaldi, C.O. (23 Aug 1819 – 2 Jan 1827 Died), restored the discipline of the seminary and the religious orders.
Giangrisostomo Dondini, C.R.L. (21 May 1827 – 10 Nov 1832 Died) 
Giovanni Niccolò Tanari (Tanara) (17 Dec 1832 – 24 Nov 1845), next Titular Patriarch of Antioch) 
Alessandro Angeloni (16 April 1846 – 5 August 1881 Died) 
Antonio Maria Pettinari, O.F.M. (18 Nov 1881 – 27 July 1885 Resigned) 
Carlo Maria Borgognini (15 Jan 1886 – 24 May 1889), next Archbishop of Modena e Nonantola) 
Nicodario Vampa (30 Dec 1889 – 27 Sep 1903 Died) 
Giovanni Maria Giuseppe Santarelli (12 Oct 1904 – 24 Sep 1908 Died) 
Ciro Pontecorvi, C.Pp.S. (29 April 1909 – 26 June 1911 Died) 
Giacomo Ghio (28 March 1912 – 20 Oct 1931 Resigned) 
Antonio Tani (1 May 1932 – 31 Dec 1952 Resigned) 
Anacleto Cazzaniga (12 Jan 1953 – 23 May 1977 Retired) 
Ugo Donato Bianchi (23 May 1977 – 4 April 1999 Died)

Archbishops of Urbino–Urbania–Sant'Angelo in Vado
United: 30 September 1986 with the Archdiocese of Urbino
Latin Name: Urbinatensis–Urbaniensis–Sancti Angeli in Vado
Metropolitan: Archdiocese of Pesaro (no longer a metropolitan see)

Francesco Marinelli (11 March 2000 – 24 June 2011 Retired) 
Giovanni Tani (24 June 2011 – ...)

See also 
 List of Catholic dioceses in Italy

Notes & references

Sources and external links 
 GCatholic - data for all sections

Urbino
Diocese
Diocese
Urbino